The Syracuse and Suburban Railroad, an interurban rail in Syracuse, New York, was chartered on June 29, 1895. The main line of this electric road, also known as the Syracuse and Suburban Electric Railroad and the Syracuse and Eastern Railroad, ran , over the beds of city streets, extending from Syracuse to Fayetteville and Manlius where it ended at Edwards Falls, a local tourist attraction.

References

Defunct railroads in Syracuse, New York
Defunct New York (state) railroads
Railway companies established in 1895
Railway companies disestablished in 1921
Interurban railways in New York (state)
DeWitt, New York